Cardiff South and Penarth may refer to:

 Cardiff South and Penarth (UK Parliament constituency)
 Cardiff South and Penarth (Senedd constituency)